The Gillsville Historic District is a  historic district in Gillsville, Georgia which was listed on the National Register of Historic Places in 1985.  The listing included 25 contributing buildings and a contributing structure.

It is a linear historic district along Georgia Route 52 and the railroad, in the small town of Gillsville, running across the border of western Banks County and eastern Hall County.

References

External links

Historic districts on the National Register of Historic Places in Georgia (U.S. state)
National Register of Historic Places in Hall County, Georgia
National Register of Historic Places in Banks County, Georgia
Victorian architecture in Georgia (U.S. state)